Kristian Kuusela (born ) is a Finnish professional ice hockey player (right wing) currently playing for Tappara of the Finnish Liiga.

Awards
 Swedish Champion with Modo Hockey: 2006–07.
 Finnish Champion with 2x Tappara and 1x Kärpät: 2007–08, 2015–16, 2016–17.
 Liiga Runners-up with  1x Ässät, 1x Kärpät ja 3x Tappara: 2005–06, 2008–09, 2013–14, 2014–15, 2017–18.
 Lasse Oksanen trophy: 2015–16
 Veli-Pekka Ketola trophy: 2015–16
 Kultainen kypärä: 2015–16
 CHL Champion with Tappara : 2022–23
 Gold medal at the Ice Hockey World Championships: 2019

Career statistics

Regular season and playoffs

International

References

External links

1983 births
Living people
Amur Khabarovsk players
Ässät players
Espoo Blues players
FoPS players
Modo Hockey players
Oulun Kärpät players
Finnish ice hockey right wingers
People from Seinäjoki
Finnish expatriate ice hockey players in Russia
Finnish expatriate ice hockey players in Sweden
Tappara players
Sportspeople from South Ostrobothnia